Coldnoon, International Journal of Travel Writing & Travelling Cultures is a literary magazine that publishes writings — poetry and nonfiction — on the subjects of city writings, culture studies, food cultures, imperial history and history of commodities, travel, geography, situationism, cartography, psychogeography, and urbanism, as well as popular travelogues. The magazine is headquartered in New Delhi, India.

History and profile
The first issue of the magazine appeared on 23 September 2011. The online edition of Coldnoon is published quarterly and the print edition twice a year. The magazine publishes and archives obsolete and out-of-copyright tracts and excerpts of writing that pertain to travel in an idiosyncratic way. The founding editor-in-chief is Arup K. Chatterjee.

References

External links 
 

2011 establishments in Delhi
Biannual magazines published in India
English-language magazines published in India
Literary magazines published in India
Online magazines published in India
Quarterly magazines published in India
Magazines established in 2011
Magazines published in Delhi
Poetry literary magazines